There were about 8 taekwondo events in the 2014 South American Games.

Medal summary

Medal table

Men's events

Women's events

References

Taekwondo
South American Games
2014